Peter Maxwell McNab (May 8, 1952 – November 6, 2022) was a Canadian-born American professional ice hockey player. He played 14 seasons in the National Hockey League (NHL) from 1973 to 1987, with the Buffalo Sabres, Boston Bruins, Vancouver Canucks, and New Jersey Devils. He later served as the color commentator for the Colorado Avalanche from their inaugural 1995–96 season until his death.

Playing career

Amateur career
Born in Vancouver, McNab spent his early childhood in British Columbia before moving to San Diego, California at age 14, where his father was head coach of the minor-league San Diego Gulls. Peter initially excelled as a baseball player; he entered the University of Denver (DU) on a baseball scholarship and later made the ice hockey team, becoming an all-WCHA selection in 1973. In the early 1970s NCAA players rarely made it to the National Hockey League, but McNab was drafted by the Buffalo Sabres while playing forward for the Denver Pioneers in 1972.

Professional career
McNab led the Cincinnati Swords of the American Hockey League (AHL) in scoring in 1973–74, despite playing in 49 of 76 games, and debuted with Buffalo that same season. While with Buffalo, he scored his first NHL goal on December 15, 1973, against the Minnesota North Stars. He helped the Sabres reach the 1975 Stanley Cup Finals.

On June 11, 1976, the Sabres traded the rights to McNab, a free agent, to the Boston Bruins in exchange for the rights to Andre Savard. He enjoyed the best years of his NHL career in Boston, scoring at least 35 goals and 75 points six seasons in a row and playing in the 1977 NHL All-Star Game. The Bruins reached the Stanley Cup Finals in 1977 and 1978. In 1978, McNab was runner-up for the Lady Byng Trophy. He also twice scored a playoff overtime winning goal. On December 23, 1979, during a game at Madison Square Garden in New York, McNab, teammate Mike Milbury, and several other Bruins climbed into the stands to confront fans. McNab engaged in a physical confrontation with one fan, and was soon joined by Milbury, who removed the fan's shoe and proceeded to strike the fan with it. On April 9, 1981, North Stars goaltender Don Beaupre stopped a McNab penalty shot, the first penalty shot ever taken by a member of the Bruins in a playoff game. As of 2022 McNab is among Boston's top ten career leaders in goals, points and playoff scoring.

The Bruins traded McNab to the Vancouver Canucks in 1984; he played in Vancouver for two seasons before signing with the New Jersey Devils, for whom his father Max was the general manager at the time. He also made his international debut for the U.S. national team at the 1986 World Championships in Moscow. He retired from hockey at the end of the 1986–87 season after playing two seasons in New Jersey.

Post-playing career
After retiring, McNab began his broadcasting career as a color analyst for the Devils starting in the 1987–88 season. After eight years broadcasting on SportsChannel for the Devils, he moved to Colorado for the inaugural season of the Colorado Avalanche. He was also a TV announcer on NBC as an analyst on NHL on NBC during the 2006 Winter Olympic games in Turin, Italy, and as a color analyst on TNT for the Olympic games in Nagano, Japan. He also served as TSN’s studio analyst and host for the 2002 Winter Olympic Games in Salt Lake City, Utah.

On June 8, 2009, McNab signed a multi-year deal with Altitude, where he started his 14th season as color commentator for the Colorado Avalanche at the beginning of the 2009–10 NHL season.

Personal life
McNab was part of a prominent ice hockey family. His father Max McNab was a centre who won the Stanley Cup with the Detroit Red Wings in 1950, and later became a coach and general manager. Peter's brother, David, spent 43 seasons as an NHL scout and executive before retiring from his position as the senior vice president of hockey operations for the Anaheim Ducks in May 2021.

In 2021, McNab was diagnosed with cancer. He continued his role as Avalanche color analyst throughout his chemotherapy. In February 2022, doctors informed McNab that his cancer was in remission. McNab died on November 6, 2022, at the age of 70.

Awards and honors

† (participation later vacated)
Played in NHL All-Star Game (1977)

Career statistics

Regular season and playoffs

International

References

External links

McNab bio at hockeydraftcentral.com

1952 births
2022 deaths
American men's ice hockey centers
Canadian emigrants to the United States
Boston Bruins players
Buffalo Sabres draft picks
Buffalo Sabres players
Canadian ice hockey centres
Canadian sports announcers
Cincinnati Swords players 
Deaths from cancer in Colorado
Denver Pioneers men's ice hockey players
Ice hockey people from Vancouver
National Hockey League All-Stars
National Hockey League broadcasters
New Jersey Devils players
Vancouver Canucks players
New Jersey Devils announcers